Ahipeaud is a surname. Notable people with the surname include:

Martial Joseph Ahipeaud (born 1966), Ivorian politician
Noel Ahipeaud, Ivorian politician